Eurolengo is a constructed language invented by Leslie Jones in 1972. It was constructed to be a common European language and "a practical tool for business and tourism."

The vocabulary consists of words borrowed from English and Spanish and made to conform to a consistent phonetic and orthographic system. Critics find a Spanglish flavor to the language, and that "reading is only straightforward if the requisite languages (in this case English and Spanish) are already familiar."

Auxiliary languages in general, and regional ones such as Eurolengo in particular, have had little support from the international community; Eurolengo has never had any speakers.

Linguistic features
According to its author, there are only three pages of grammar rules.

Alphabet

The Eurolengo alphabet is almost the same as the English alphabet, except there is no C (its phonemes being taken over by either S or K), but the Ch digraph is treated as a letter.

a=ah, b= bay, ch = chay, d=day, e = eh, f=eff, g=gay, h=ash, i = ee, j = jay, k = kay, l = ell, m = em, n = en, o = oh, p = pay, q=kw, r=air, s = ess, t=tay, u = oo, v = vee, w=wee, x = eks, y = eye, z = zed

Verbs
According to its author all verbs are regular.

Nouns
Nouns in Eurolengo have no gender, but a suffix can be added to derive specifically feminine words from their masculine counterparts, such as in the case of making kusin into kusina to indicate a male cousin or a female cousin.

Example
Eurolengo isto tres fasil. Le lengo habo un diksionarie de venti mil paroles. It isto kompletik fonetik and le difisile sonds in le lengos de West Europe isto elimanado.

References

External links 
 Sample Conjugations of Eurolengo Verbs

Zonal constructed languages
Constructed languages introduced in the 1970s